Lübtheen is a municipality  in the Ludwigslust-Parchim district, in Mecklenburg-Western Pomerania, Germany. It is situated 28 km west of Ludwigslust, and 37 km southwest of Schwerin. It is part of the Hamburg Metropolitan Region.

Populated places
The city of Lübtheen (formerly an amt) consists of the following zones with their respective populated places:

 Lübtheen Borough
 Jessenitz-Werk, Neu Lübtheen, Probst Jesar, Quassel, Trebs
 Garlitz Borough
 Garlitz, Brömsenberg, Gudow, Langenheide
 Gößlow Borough
 Gößlow, Bandekow, Lübbendorf, Neuenrode
 Jessenitz Borough
 Jessenitz, Benz, Briest, Jessenitz-Siedlung, Lank, Volzrade

The former independent municipalities of Garlitz, Gößlow and Jessenitz were incorporated into the expanded city of Lübtheen on 13 June 2004.

Notable people
Friedrich Chrysander (1826–1901), music historian, critic and publisher

References

Cities and towns in Mecklenburg
Ludwigslust-Parchim
Populated places established in 1938